Patrick Pelloux (born 19 August 1963 in Villeneuve-Saint-Georges, Val-de-Marne) is a French physician and activist. He is a specialist of emergency medical services.

Biography
Patrick Pelloux became well known in France during the 2003 European heat wave, as he was the first to point out that thousands of people were dying, though the French authorities denied it.

Since 2004, he has written articles in Charlie Hebdo, a satirical newspaper, on the work of an emergency physician.

Since 2008, he has been chairman of Association des médecins urgentistes de France (a French trade union for emergency physicians). He is opposed to bullfighting.

During the Charlie Hebdo shooting, on 7 January 2015, he was near the magazine's building, so he was one of the first people on the spot after the shooting, having been called by someone who worked for the magazine. He immediately phoned French President François Hollande to tell him what had happened. He saw that some of his friends were dead and provided first aid to the others.

Filmography
 2009 : Incognito, directed by Éric Lavaine
 2012 : Bad Girl, directed by Patrick Mille

Bibliography

References

Charlie Hebdo people
French emergency physicians
Living people
1963 births
People from Villeneuve-Saint-Georges
French medical writers
French male non-fiction writers